Booby Pond Nature Reserve is a protected wetland on Little Cayman, one of the Cayman Islands, a British Overseas Territory in the Caribbean Sea.

Description
The reserve lies on the south coast of Little Cayman, near the western end of the island. It comprises  a 43 ha seasonally flooded hypersaline lagoon with a fringe of mangroves and a strip of dry forest on its northern side. The forest is dominated by Bursera simaruba, Canella winterana, Coccothrinax procterii, Ficus aurea, Guipera discolour, Myrcianthus fragrans and Plumeria obtusa, while the mangroves are intermixed with Thespesia populnea and Cordia sebestena var. caymanensis.

Birds
The site has been identified by BirdLife International as a 136 ha Important Bird Area (IBA) because it supports populations of West Indian whistling ducks (with 20 breeding pairs), magnificent frigatebirds (with up to 200 breeding pairs), red-footed boobies (with up to 20,000 individuals), white-crowned pigeons, Caribbean elaenias and vitelline warblers. Much of the site is also recognised as a wetland of international importance under the Ramsar Convention.

References

Little Cayman
Important Bird Areas of the Cayman Islands
Ramsar sites in the Cayman Islands
Saline lakes of North America
Seabird colonies